Kujawy, or Kuyavia, is a region of north-central Poland. It may also refer to:

Places
 Drążdżewo-Kujawy, a village in east-central Poland
 Kujawy, Kuyavian-Pomeranian Voivodeship, a village in north-central Poland
 Kujawy, Masovian Voivodeship, a village in east-central Poland
 Kujawy, Opole Voivodeship, a village in south-west Poland
 Kujawy, Pomeranian Voivodeship, a settlement in northern Poland
 Kujawy, Świętokrzyskie Voivodeship, a village in south-central Poland
 Kujawy mine, a salt mine in northern Poland

Other uses
 Kujawy Markowice, a football club based in Markowice